Cavallasca was a comune (municipality) in the Province of Como in the Italian region Lombardy, located about  north of Milan and about  west of Como, on the border with Switzerland. It's a frazione of San Fermo della Battaglia since 2017.

Demographic evolution

References

Cities and towns in Lombardy